Thermochoria jeanneli is a species of dragonfly in the family Libellulidae. It is found in Kenya, Malawi, Tanzania, and Zambia. Its natural habitats are subtropical or tropical moist lowland forests, shrub-dominated wetlands, and freshwater marshes. It is threatened by habitat loss.

References

Sources

Libellulidae
Taxonomy articles created by Polbot
Insects described in 1915